"500 Miles" (also known as "500 Miles Away from Home" or "Railroaders' Lament") is a song made popular in the United States and Europe during the 1960s folk revival. The simple repetitive lyrics offer a lament by a traveler who is far from home, out of money and too ashamed to return.

History
The song is generally credited as being written by Hedy West, and a 1961 copyright is held by Atzal Music, Inc. "500 Miles" is West's "most anthologized song". Some recordings have also credited Curly Williams, or John Phillips as co-writers, although Phillips admitted he had only rearranged it and "didn't deserve the credit". David Neale writes that "500 Miles" may be related to the older folk song "900 Miles" (Roud 4959), which may itself have origins in the Southern American fiddle tunes "Reuben's Train" and "Train 45".
Johnny Cash is known to have included "500 Miles" on his list of 100 essential country songs in the early 1970s.

Bobby Bare version

The most commercially successful version of the song was Bobby Bare's in 1963. His version became a Top 10 hit on the U.S. Billboard Hot 100, as well as a Top 5 hit on both the Country and Adult Contemporary charts.

Chart history

Weekly charts

Year-end charts

Other cover versions
The song appears on the 1961 eponymous debut album by The Journeymen; this may have been its first release.
The song was heard on the February 1962 Kingston Trio live album College Concert (a 1962 US #3).
It was further popularized by Peter, Paul and Mary, who included the song on their debut album in May 1962.
American country music singer Bobby Bare recorded a version with new lyrics, which became a hit single in 1963.
Dick and Dee Dee released a version of the song on their 1964 album, Turn Around.
The song was covered by Sonny & Cher on their 1965 album Look at Us. This version was played over the credits of the 1966 BBC TV film Cathy Come Home.
The lyrics feature heavily in the Bob Dylan song "I Was Young When I Left Home."
Bluegrass versions were recorded by The Country Gentlemen on their album 25 Years and The Seldom Scene on their album Act I.
The Hooters recorded a version of this song with additional lyrics, dedicated to the Tiananmen Square protests of 1989. Peter, Paul and Mary provided background vocals for them, as well. This version is on the album Zig Zag.
It has also been recorded by Terry Callier (as ″900 Miles″ on The New Folk Sound of Terry Callier), Lonnie Donegan, the Brothers Four, Glen Campbell, Johnny Rivers, Reba McEntire, Jackie DeShannon, The Seekers, Elvis Presley, Peter and Gordon, Eric Bibb, Hootenanny Singers, Joan Baez, Takako Matsu, The Persuasions, Slater Rhea and many others. Recently, the song has been recorded by Justin Timberlake, Carey Mulligan and Stark Sands for the soundtrack of the film Inside Llewyn Davis.
Rosanne Cash covered the song on her 2009 album The List.
Niger's pioneer of electronic music Mamman Sani recorded an instrumental version, which is included in the compilation album Unreleased Tapes 1981-1984.

In other languages

Albanian 
Ilirët sang in Albanian.

Assamese 
Jayanta Hazarika sang in Assamese "Ketiyaba Bejarote" in 1962.
Again, in 2018, Zubeen Garg sang "Kot Mor Maa" for a drama of Aawahan Mobile Theatre group.

Bengali 
Bengali singer Anjan Dutt sung the song in Bengali called "Mr. Hall" in his 1997 album Keu Gaan Gaye.

Chinese 
In 2017, a Chinese adaptation of the song called "别送我" (English: "Don't send me off") was released on the soundtrack of Duckweed and sung by Chen Hongyu, Su Zixu, Liu Hao Lin, and Han Luo.

Czech 
Czech version was recorded in 1967 as "Tisíc mil" (English: "Thousand Miles") with the lyrics by Ivo Fischer, sung as a duet by Waldemar Matuška and Helena Vondráčková.

Finnish 
In Finnish, the song has been recorded under at least five different song titles. In 1963 Erkki Pohjanheimo recorded the song under title "Juna jättää laiturin" (English: "The Train Leaves the Platform"). Lyrics were written by Reino Helismaa. Pohjanheimo recorded the song from its French title "J'entends siffler le train", and it was on the B side of a 7" single called "Kutsukaa Tri Casey" (almost direct translation from "Callin' Dr. Casey", a hit by John D. Loudermilk). 
The following year, a Finnish vocal quartet Neljä Penniä (English: Four Pennies) recorded a 7" single that consisted of two songs: "Washington Square" on the A side, and on the flip side there was a Finnish version of "500 Miles" under the title "Pitkät illat" (English: "The Long Evenings"), lyrics by Sauvo Puhtila. 
Also in 1964, another version of the song was recorded by folk-spirited trio Anki, Bosse & Robert and titled "Viimeinen vihellys" (English: "The Last Whistle"), lyrics by Juha Vainio. "Viimeinen vihellys" was also a 7" single B side, on the A side there was Will Holt's song "Lemon Tree" (Finnish: "Sitruunapuu"). "Viimeinen vihellys" was released also on their self-titled record in 1965. 
In 1979, the song was recorded yet again, by Jukka Raitanen. This time it was called "Liian kaukana" (English: "Too Far Away"). Lyrics were written by Raul Reiman. This song was released on Raitanen's album Yölinjalla. "Yölinjalla(in)" song is a Finnish version of the song "I Walk the Line" by Johnny Cash.

Moreover, "500 Miles" has also been released with religious content under the name "Lapsuuden usko" (English: "Childhood Faith"), with lyrics by Matti Nyberg. This version has been recorded at least three times: 1973, 2005 and 2011. It was released by a parish singer group Dominicones in 1973. In 2005 it was recorded by actor and singer Mikko Leppilampi. The song was released on album "Tilkkutäkki" (English: "Quilt", by various artists), and targeted to people who want to nostalgize the time of their confirmation on Lutheran church. In 2011 it was recorded by Petrus (real name Petri Kokko, born 1970) in his album Enkelten laulut (English: "The Songs of Angels").

French 
Richard Anthony had a hit with a French version of the song, "Et j'entends siffler le train" (English: "I Hear the Whistle of the Train"). It reached number-one in France in 1962. Anthony's version was covered by Franco Battiato on his 1999 album Fleurs.

German 
In 1963 a German version, "Und dein Zug fährt durch die Nacht" (English: "And Your Train Goes Through the Night"), was a success for Peter Beil. Also in German, Santiano in 2012 released a marine-themed version, "500 Meilen", on their album Bis ans Ende der Welt.

Hindi 
Indian composer Rajesh Roshan used the tune to compose song 'Jab Koyi Baat Bigad Jaaye' (English: "When Things Go Wrong") in 1990's movie Jurm.

Indonesian 
The tune of this song has been used in religious contents in Indonesia, in the widely popular book of songs and praise for Catholics in Indonesia, "Madah Bakti", song #366 "Ya Tuhan Kami Datang".

Japanese 
The Japanese duo Wink included it as the B-side of their 1989 single , under the title . In 2018, Japanese singer Kiyoe Yoshioka sang a Japanese version of the song, "500 Mairu" (500マイル) on her debut album Uta Iro.

Slovenian 
The Slovene singer Lado Leskovar wrote a 1965 hit based on the song titled "Poslednji vlak" (English: "The Last Train").

Spanish 
Costa Rican rock band Los Rufos recorded a Spanish version under the title "500 Millas" in 1967. A similar version was recorded by the Nicaraguan band Los Rockets.

Vietnamese 
There are two versions in Vietnamese. One is "Tiễn em lần cuối" ("Send You Off for the Last Time") sung by Trung Hanh, another one is "Người tình ngàn dặm" ("Thousands-mile-away Lover") sung by Ngọc Lan.

Hebrew 
There is a Hebrew version by Aviva Marks called, "500 מייל"  in 1966.  The meaning of the name is "500 mile" and it came part of her album sweeter than wine ("מתוק מיין").

The song is mostly translation to Hebrew except for the tune is stayed in English.

In media
Peter, Paul & Mary's version of the song was used in the following:

 Rocky Mountain Express: 2011 Canadian film which chronicles the early history of the Canadian Pacific Railway while following restored steam locomotive Canadian Pacific 2816 along the route.
 Mr Inbetween: 2018-21 Australian TV series used it in Season Two, Episode Eight: "You'll See Me in Your Dreams."
 Professor T.: 2021 Crime Drama featuring Ben Miller used the version in Season One: Episode Four: 'Mother Love'.
 In the 2022 film Bullet Train a version of the song is used by Song For Memories.

See also
American fiddle
List of train songs

References

1961 songs
1962 singles
1963 singles
The Kingston Trio songs
Peter, Paul and Mary songs
Bobby Bare songs
Dick and Dee Dee songs
The Hooters songs
Glen Campbell songs
Songs about loneliness
Songs about trains
American folk songs